Kevin Pauwels (born 12 April 1984 in Ekeren) is a Belgian former professional racing cyclist, who rode professionally between 2004 and 2019 for the  and  teams. Pauwels retired on 24 February 2019 after winning the Sluitingsprijs Oostmalle.

Pauwels' elder brother, Tim Pauwels was also a professional cyclo-cross racer but died during a race in Erpe-Mere in 2004.

Major results

Road

2002
 3rd Road race, National Junior Championships
2006
 1st Stage 4 Spar Arden Challenge
 1st Stage 5 Tour de Liège
2007
 1st Stage 1 Volta a Lleida
 3rd Derny, Brasschaat
2008
 1st Stage 2 Volta a Lleida
2010
 1st Stage 2 Flèche du Sud
 1st Stage 4 Tour de Serbie
2011
 1st Stage 3 Kreiz Breizh Elites
2015
 7th Overall Flèche du Sud
2018
 5th Dwars door de Vlaamse Ardennen

Mountain Bike

2011
 1st  Cross-country, National Championships
2012
 1st  Cross-country, National Championships
2013
 1st Landgraaf
 2nd Sankt Vith
2017
 1st Kluisbergen
 3rd Cross-country, National Championships

Cyclo-cross

2000–2001
 3rd National Junior Championships
2001–2002
 1st  UCI World Junior Championships
 1st  National Junior Championships
 1st Overall Junior Superprestige
1st Ruddervoorde
1st Sint-Michielsgestel
1st Gieten
1st Vorselaar
2003–2004
 1st  UCI World Under-23 Championships
 Under-23 Superprestige
2nd Hoogstraten
3rd Vorselaar
 3rd Overall Under-23 Gazet van Antwerpen
3rd Koppenbergcross
2004–2005
 1st Overall Under-23 Gazet van Antwerpen
1st Azencross
3rd Koppenbergcross
 2nd Kalmthout
 Under-23 Superprestige
2nd Gavere
2nd Hoogstraten
 3rd National Under-23 Championships
 3rd Under-23 Milan
 Under-23 UCI World Cup
3rd Wetzikon
3rd Nommay
2005–2006
 1st  Overall Under-23 UCI World Cup
1st Wetzikon
1st Liévin
2nd Kalmthout
 1st Under-23 Hofstade
 1st Under-23 Hasselt
 2nd Overall Under-23 Gazet van Antwerpen
2nd Krawatencross
 Under-23 Superprestige
2nd Gavere
2nd Gieten
2nd Ruddervoorde
3rd Sint-Michielsgestel
3rd Vorselaar
 2nd National Under-23 Championships
 2nd Under-23 Pijnacker
2006–2007
 Superprestige
2nd Sint-Michielsgestel
3rd Diegem
2007–2008
 2nd Huijbergen
 Gazet van Antwerpen
3rd GP Sven Nys
2008–2009
 1st Overijse
 UCI World Cup
2nd Heusden-Zolder
3rd Kalmthout
 Gazet van Antwerpen
2nd Hasselt
 2nd Harderwijk
 3rd National Championships
2009–2010
 UCI World Cup
1st Heusden-Zolder
3rd Hoogerheide
 2nd Overijse
 2nd Maldegem
 2nd Erpe-Mere
 Gazet van Antwerpen
2nd Hasselt
3rd Krawatencross
3rd Sluitingsprijs
 Superprestige
2nd Gieten
3rd Diegem
3rd Zonhoven
 3rd Tervuren
2010–2011
 1st Heerlen
 2nd Overall UCI World Cup
1st Pont-Château
2nd Plzeň
2nd Hoogerheide
3rd Aigle
3rd Kalmthout
 2nd Overijse
 2nd Asteasu
 2nd Overall Superprestige
2nd Zonhoven
2nd Gavere
2nd Middelkerke
3rd Hoogstraten
 3rd  UCI World Championships
 3rd National Championships
 3rd Erpe-Mere
 3rd Overall Gazet van Antwerpen
1st Hasselt
1st Krawatencross
3rd Namur
3rd Koppenbergcross
3rd GP Rouwmoer
2011–2012
 1st  Overall UCI World Cup
1st Tábor
1st Igorre
1st Heusden-Zolder
1st Hoogerheide
2nd Koksijde
2nd Liévin
2nd Plzeň
 1st Overall Gazet van Antwerpen
1st Koppenbergcross
1st Ronse
1st Hasselt
2nd GP Sven Nys
3rd Krawatencross
3rd Sluitingsprijs
 1st Otegem
 1st Erpe-Mere
 1st Heerlen
 2nd Overall Superprestige
1st Gavere
2nd Hamme
2nd Gieten
2nd Diegem
2nd Hoogstraten
3rd Zonhoven
 2nd Maldegem
 2nd Neerpelt
 3rd  UCI World Championships
 3rd Niel
2012–2013
 1st Scheldecross
 2nd Overall UCI World Cup
1st Tábor
1st Namur
1st Rome
2nd Roubaix
3rd Plzeň
 Soudal Classics
2nd Leuven
 3rd Overall Bpost Bank Trophy
1st GP Sven Nys
2nd Ronse
3rd Hasselt
3rd Azencross
 Superprestige
2nd Diegem
3rd Ruddervoorde
3rd Gieten
3rd Hoogstraten
 3rd National Championships
2013–2014
 1st Kalmthout
 Bpost Bank Trophy
1st GP Rouwmoer
2nd Koppenbergcross
3rd Sluitingsprijs
 UCI World Cup
2nd Cauberg
3rd Tábor
 Superprestige
2nd Middelkerke
 Soudal Classics
2nd Leuven
 3rd  UCI World Championships
 3rd Overijse
2014–2015
 1st  Overall UCI World Cup
1st Milton Keynes
1st Namur
2nd Cauberg
2nd Koksijde
2nd Heusden-Zolder
 1st Otegem
 1st Maldegem
 2nd Oostmalle
 2nd Eeklo
 2nd Sint-Niklaas
 2nd Overall Superprestige
1st Zonhoven
1st Spa-Francorchamps
1st Middelkerke
2nd Gavere
2nd Hoogstraten
3rd Diegem
 2nd Overall Bpost Bank Trophy
1st Hasselt
3rd Koppenbergcross
3rd GP Sven Nys
 Soudal Classics
3rd Niel
3rd Leuven
3rd Mechelen
2015–2016
 Superprestige
1st Ruddervoorde
2nd Diegem
3rd Zonhoven
3rd Gavere
3rd Spa-Francorchamps
 Soudal Classics
1st Niel
2nd Neerpelt
3rd Hasselt
 1st Oostmalle
 2nd Overall BPost Bank Trophy
2nd Koppenbergcross
2nd Ronse
3rd Flandriencross
 2nd Overijse
 2nd Maldegem
 3rd  UCI World Championships
 3rd  UEC European Championships
 3rd Otegem
 3rd Overall UCI World Cup
2nd Heusden-Zolder
3rd Namur
3rd Hoogerheide
2016–2017
 2nd National Championships
 2nd Overall UCI World Cup
2nd Iowa City
3rd Namur
3rd Zeven
3rd Heusden-Zolder
 2nd Overall DVV Trophy
2nd Koppenbergcross
2nd GP Rouwmoer
3rd Scheldecross
3rd Azencross
 Soudal Classics
2nd Niel
2nd Leuven
 3rd  UCI World Championships
 3rd Overijse
 Superprestige
3rd Diegem
3rd Hoogstraten
2018–2019
 1st Hasselt
 1st Zonnebeke
 1st Oostmalle

References

External links

1984 births
Living people
Belgian male cyclists
Cyclo-cross cyclists
Cyclists from Antwerp
People from Ekeren